Keyser Ullman was a British merchant bank, based in London and founded in 1868.

History

Foundation
Samuel Montagu (1832–1911) and his two original partners in the bank Samuel Montagu & Co., Ellis Abraham Franklin (1822–1909) and Edwin Louis Samuel (1825–1877), had four sons each. Wishing to provide employment opportunities for all twelve sons, Samuel Montagu and his partners decided to open a new bank. Controlled by Samuel Montagu, it was managed by two of his employees, Assam Keyser and Gustav Bitter, and named A. Keyser & Co.. The agreement between the three partners was, that each of them would be able to place two sons at Samuel Montagu & Co. and two sons at A. Keyser & Co.. But things did not work out quite like planned and the two companies became completely separate in 1909.

In The Rise of Merchant Banking, Stanley D. Chapman describes Keyser & Co as a "second eleven" for the numerous sons of the Samuels, Montagus, and the Franklins.

In 1962, it acquired the Ullmann bank and in 1965 changed its name to Keyser Ullmann (KU). In the early 1970s, the bank, particularly through its managing directors, Roland Franklin and Ian Stoutzker, became very active in corporate finance. One very substantial part of this business was its role as financial adviser to some of the companies associated with Sir James Goldsmith.

Demise
Sir Edward du Cann, a Member of Parliament (MP) and former chairman of the Conservative Party, was chairman of Keyser Ullman from 1970 to 1975. In October 1974, du Cann and the executive of the 1922 Committee met at du Cann's Keyser Ullman offices in Milk Street, where it was decided that the Committee would press Edward Heath to hold a leadership election, which led to Margaret Thatcher becoming party leader. The press called them the "Milk Street Mafia".

A Department of Trade and Industry report into the failure of Keyser Ullman found du Cann to have been "incompetent" while chairman between 1970 and 1975. "In 1973, the bank lent £17m to a 28-year- old entrepreneur, Christopher Selmes, secured on a valueless guarantee. Mr Selmes later fled the country, leaving debts of more than £20m."

Property developer Jack Dellal (1923–2012) sold his merchant bank, Dalton Barton to Keyser Ullman for £58m just before the 1973-74 banking crisis that caused Keyser's failure. Dellal was deputy chairman of Keyser and some have argued that he was "prime culprit" in the failure of Keyser Ullman and du Cann's resulting bankruptcy. Keyser Ullman was saved by the Bank of England and eventually sold to Charterhouse Bank in 1981.

References

Banks established in 1868
Defunct banks of the United Kingdom